Undergraduate Texts in Mathematics (UTM) is a series of undergraduate-level textbooks in mathematics published by Springer-Verlag.  The books in this series, like the other Springer-Verlag mathematics series, are small yellow books of a standard size.

The books in this series tend to be written at a more elementary level than the similar Graduate Texts in Mathematics series, although there is a fair amount of overlap between the two series in terms of material covered and difficulty level.

There is no Springer-Verlag numbering of the books like in the Graduate Texts in Mathematics series. 
The books are numbered here by year of publication.

List of books

External links
 Springer-Verlag's Summary of Undergraduate Texts in Mathematics

Series of mathematics books
Mathematics-related lists
Mathematics textbooks